Triple Island is a rocky, barren islet, marked by Triple Island Lightstation, located approximately halfway between the southwestern tip of Dundas Island and the westernmost tip of Stephens Island, islands of the North Coast of British Columbia, Canada about  west of Prince Rupert.
It hosts a helipad .

References

Islands of British Columbia